John Cottisford (died c.1540) was an English churchman and academic, Rector of Lincoln College, Oxford, from 1518.

Life
He was educated at Lincoln College, taking the degrees of B.A. in 1505, M.A. in 1510, and D.D. in 1525 (3 July). He served as proctor for 1515, and, on the resignation of Thomas Drax, was elected rector of his college (2 March 1518). This position he held for nearly twenty years. He was also commissary or Vice-Chancellor of Oxford University. He received this appointment from Archbishop William Warham, the chancellor, on the death of Thomas Musgrave in the autumn of 1527, and took the oaths on 7 December. On Warham's death in August 1532 he resigned, and was succeeded by William Tresham, the nominee of John Longland, bishop of Lincoln, the newly elected Chancellor. As commissary, Cottisford was engaged in the attempt to stop the introduction of heretical Protestant books into Oxford, and in the arrest of Thomas Garret, parson of Honey Lane, London, who was active in the distribution of such literature, and was subsequently burnt at Smithfield in company with Robert Barnes and William Jerome. An account of the whole affair, and the dismay of Cottisford on hearing of Garret's escape from prison, is in John Foxe's Acts and Monuments.

In 1532, Henry VIII nominated him as one of the canons of the new college, to become Christ Church, Oxford, which he erected on the foundation laid by Cardinal Wolsey, but he continued to hold his rectorship of Lincoln College, in which capacity he signed an acknowledgment of the royal supremacy on 30 July 1534. His connection with Lincoln College was terminated by his resignation on 7 January 1538, and shortly after he was collated to the prebend of All Saints in Hungate, Lincoln. His successor was collated in October 1542.

References

Sources

Year of birth missing
1540 deaths
Alumni of Lincoln College, Oxford
Rectors of Lincoln College, Oxford
Fellows of Christ Church, Oxford
Vice-Chancellors of the University of Oxford
16th-century English Anglican priests